Saltsa kima, Greece's most popular topping for spaghetti, is a ground beef and tomato sauce spiced with cinnamon, allspice, and cloves.  Makaronia me kima (pasta topped with saltsa kima) is the basis for Cincinnati chili and the sauces used to top Coney Island hot dogs, dishes developed by Greek immigrant restaurateurs in the United States in the 1920s.

See also 

 Greek cuisine

References

Greek cuisine
Greek-American cuisine
Greek sauces
Toppings